Hidden is the third album by Paul Haslinger, released in 1996 through Side Effects.

Track listing

Personnel 
John Bergin – cover art
Thomas Dimuzio – instruments
Paul Haslinger – instruments, production
Loren Nerell – instruments
David Torn – instruments

References 

1996 albums
Paul Haslinger albums